Munneswaram may refer to the following topics related to Sri Lanka:

Munneswaram temple, a Hindu temple dedicated to Shiva
Munneswaram (village), where Munneswaram temple is situated